Terminal 1 of Shuangliu International Airport is a station on Line 10 of the Chengdu Metro in China. It was opened on 6 September 2017. The station serves Terminal 1 of Chengdu Shuangliu International Airport.

Station layout

Gallery

References

Railway stations in Sichuan
Railway stations in China opened in 2017
Chengdu Metro stations
Airport railway stations in China
September 2017 events in China